Na Chuang (born May 15, 1987) is a Chinese baseball outfielder who plays with the Guangdong Leopards in the China Baseball League. 

Na represented China at the 2013 East Asian Games, 2014 Asian Games, 2015 Summer Universiade, 2015 Asian Baseball Championship, 2017 World Baseball Classic and 2018 Asian Games.

References

1987 births
Living people
Asian Games competitors for China
Baseball outfielders
Baseball players at the 2014 Asian Games
Baseball players at the 2018 Asian Games
Chinese expatriate baseball players in the United States
Guangdong Leopards players
Texas AirHogs players
2017 World Baseball Classic players